Amsactarctia is a genus of tiger moths in the family Erebidae erected by Emilio Berio in 1938.

Species
 Amsactarctia pulchra (Rothschild, 1933)
 Amsactarctia radiosa (Pagenstecher, 1903)
 Amsactarctia venusta (Toulgoët, 1980)

References
Natural History Museum Lepidoptera generic names catalog

Spilosomina
Moth genera